Doudou Mapwanga Kitanda Djike (born 6 February 1982) is Congolese born French professional boxer competing in the Light heavyweight division.

Professional career

Ngumbu turned professional in 2007 and won his first 20 fights with 9 stoppage victories. He would taste defeat for the first time against Malawian boxer Isaac Chilemba. He got his first shot at a title in his third fight against russian boxer Igor Mikhalkin. Ngumbu with a record of 38-8, would finally get an opportunity to fight for a major world title against WBC Light heavyweight champion Oleksandr Gvozdyk.

Professional boxing record

References

External links

1982 births
Living people
French male boxers
Light-heavyweight boxers
Sportspeople from Kinshasa
African Boxing Union champions
21st-century Democratic Republic of the Congo people